Paul Reid Johnson Calderon is an American writer, television personality, and socialite known for starring alongside Tinsley Mortimer in The CW's 2010 television series High Society.

Personal life
Calderon was raised in New England, mainly Maine, and Northampton, Massachusetts, but also for a time resided in Berkeley, California. He has a close relationship with his mother. He identifies as gay. Calderon attended Deerfield Academy and graduated in the class of 2003. He then went on to attend Trinity College and Sarah Lawrence College.

In 2011 Calderon was arrested after allegedly breaking into the Pi Kappa Alpha fraternity house at the University of Massachusetts.

In 2013 Calderon announced via social media that he was sober after admitting himself to McLean Hospital for treatment and partaking in the SMART Recovery program.

Career
Calderon worked as a fashion stylist and assistant for Lauren Davis of Vogue Magazine for a short time. He is a former guest columnist, blogger, and market editor for Paper Magazine and also wrote for Deuxmoi.com.

After leaving Vogue, Johnson Calderon starred in The CW's reality television show High Society alongside other socially prominent New Yorkers.

References

Living people
Writers from New York City
American socialites
American LGBT writers
Participants in American reality television series
American fashion journalists
Sarah Lawrence College alumni
Trinity College (Connecticut) alumni
McLean Hospital patients
Writers from Northampton, Massachusetts
Year of birth missing (living people)